Anthidium edwini is a species of bee in the family Megachilidae, the leaf-cutter, carder, or mason bees.

Distribution
Chile

References

edwini
Insects described in 1935
Endemic fauna of Chile